Elbtalaue is a Samtgemeinde ("collective municipality") in the district of Lüchow-Dannenberg, in Lower Saxony, Germany. Its seat is in the town Dannenberg. Actually, the word "Elbtalaue" means Elbe valley and describes a spatially not sharply defined region around the river's middle reaches in northern Germany.

The Samtgemeinde Elbtalaue consists of the following municipalities:

Damnatz
Dannenberg 
Göhrde
Gusborn
Hitzacker
Jameln
Karwitz
Langendorf
Neu Darchau 
Zernien

Samtgemeinden in Lower Saxony